Sun-Times Media Group (formerly Hollinger International) is a Chicago-based newspaper publisher.

History
Sun-Times Media Group was founded in 1986 under the name American Publishing Company, as a holding company for Hollinger Inc.'s American properties. It focused on newspapers, mostly in smaller markets. In February 1994, it acquired the Chicago Sun-Times, holding an initial public offering (IPO) to fund the acquisition. At the time, it was the fifteenth-largest U.S. newspaper group. It changed its name to Hollinger International in 1994.

Hollinger's non-American properties, which included The Daily Telegraph and The Jerusalem Post were added to the company in 1996, and its Canadian papers in 1997. It created the National Post from the Financial Post in 1998.

That year, it began a process of shrinking the company, selling many of its small papers to the private equity firm Leonard Green & Partners, who formed Liberty Group Publishing. In 2000, it sold most of the rest to four media companies (Bradford Publications Company, Community Newspaper Holdings, Paxton Media Group, and Forum Communications). Its Canadian holdings, notably the National Post, several smaller papers, and a majority stake in the Southam newspaper chain, were sold to CanWest in 2000 in connection with Conrad Black renouncing his Canadian citizenship to gain a British peerage. That year, Hollinger International bought the Chicago-area publications of Copley Press (The Herald News, The Beacon-News, The Courier-News, and Lake County News-Sun, along with several smaller papers).

Conrad Black was fired by the Hollinger International board in 2004 for fraud. He attempted to sell his stake to the Barclay brothers in January 2004 and the brothers launched a takeover bid for the rest of Hollinger International. However the sale was blocked by a judge in the United States after the company's board lodged a court action against the sale.

The Barclay brothers later bought The Telegraph Group which included The Daily Telegraph, The Sunday Telegraph, and The Spectator. On November 16, 2004, the sale of The Jerusalem Post to Mirkaei Tikshoret, a Tel Aviv-based publisher of Israeli newspapers, was announced. CanWest Global Communications, Canada's biggest media concern, announced it has agreed to take a 50 percent stake in The Jerusalem Post after Mirkaei buys the property. In February 2006, Hollinger sold substantially all of its Canadian assets.

The corporation's name was changed to Sun-Times Media Group on July 17, 2006.

On March 31, 2009, the company filed for bankruptcy protection under Chapter 11 of the United States Code.

In September 2009, Chicago financier James C. Tyree and a team of investors had a $5 million bid accepted to purchase the Sun-Times Media Group, contingent on the paper's unions accepting deep compensation cuts and work-rule changes.  The purchase was completed the next month.

Tyree died suddenly in March 2011. Jeremy Halbreich, chief executive, said that Tyree will be greatly missed and that his death will make no changes in the media company's strategy.

Since the Tyree-Halbreich takeover, the organization has shown accelerating declines in circulation, advertising revenue and quality of editorial content. Industry analysts have repeatedly pointed to the group's failure to craft a competitive online product as evidence of continued decline. On December 6, 2011, the company announced it will institute a paywall to access its online content from December 8, 2011.

Later in December 2011, Chicago investment group Wrapports, L.L.C., led by Chairman Michael W. Ferro Jr. & CEO Timothy Knight, bought the properties of Sun-Times Media Holdings.

Corporate governance
November 17, 2003
 Conrad Black resigns as chairman after an internal inquiry alleges that Black had received more than $7 million in unauthorized payments of company funds.

January 14, 2004
 Hollinger International files a  million lawsuit against Conrad Black and David Radler.

October 2005
Gordon A. Paris, chairman of the board of directors, president, chief executive officer and director
Paul B. Healy, vice president, corporate development and investor relations
Peter K. Lane, vice president, chief financial officer
Robert T. Smith, treasurer
James R. Van Horn, vice president, general counsel and secretary
John Cruickshank, chief operating officer, head of the Chicago group
 Members of the board of directors: Gordon Paris, Richard Burt, Daniel Colson, Cyrus Freidheim, Henry Kissinger, Shmuel Meitar, John O'Brien, Richard Perle, Graham Savage, Raymond G. H. Seitz, and James R. Thompson.

November 2006
 Cyrus Freidheim is hired as president and CEO.

February 2009
 Cyrus Freidheim resigns as CEO after New York-based hedge fund Davidson Kempner forces the ousting of all but one member of the board of directors.
 Jeremy Halbreich becomes the new chairman and interim chief executive.

See also
Lerner Newspapers

References

External links
 Sun-Times Media Group official site
 Pioneer Press, local newspapers' site (part of Chicago Tribune)
 Ketupa.net – Media Profiles: Hollinger, Black & the Barclays Extensive background information, including past and present media holdings. 
  U.S. SEC – Breeden Report Complete 512-page copy of the Report of Investigation by the Special Committee of the Board of Directors of Hollinger International Inc.
 A Hollinger company history

Newspaper companies in Chicago
Publishing companies established in 1986
1986 establishments in Illinois
Chicago Sun-Times
Companies that filed for Chapter 11 bankruptcy in 2009